The  Orlando Predators season was the 20th season for the franchise in the Arena Football League. The team was coached by Pat O'Hara. This was the Predators' first season at Amway Center. The Predators finished the regular season 11–7, qualifying for the playoffs for the 19th consecutive season. As the 4th seed in the American Conference, they lost to the Jacksonville Sharks in the conference semifinals, 48–63.

Standings

Season schedule

Preseason

Regular season
The Predators had a bye during Week 1, and began the season the following week on the road against the New Orleans VooDoo on March 18. They played their first game at Amway Center against the Utah Blaze on March 24. On July 23, they will host New Orleans for their final regular season game.

Playoffs

Roster

Regular season

Week 1: BYE

Week 2: at New Orleans VooDoo

Week 3: vs. Utah Blaze

Week 4: at Arizona Rattlers

Week 5: vs. Philadelphia Soul

Week 6: at Georgia Force

Week 7: vs. Spokane Shock

Week 8: at Jacksonville Sharks

Week 9: vs. Tampa Bay Storm

Week 10: vs. Cleveland Gladiators

Week 11: BYE

Week 12: at Milwaukee Mustangs

Week 13: at Iowa Barnstormers

Week 14: vs. Jacksonville Sharks

Week 15: at Tampa Bay Storm

Week 16: vs. Georgia Force

Week 17: vs. Pittsburgh Power

Week 18: at San Jose SaberCats

Week 19: at Tulsa Talons

Week 20: vs. New Orleans VooDoo

Playoffs

American Conference Semifinals: at (1) Jacksonville Sharks

References

Orlando Predators
Orlando Predators seasons
2011 in sports in Florida
2010s in Orlando, Florida